Bonnay is a commune in the Doubs department in the Bourgogne-Franche-Comté region in eastern France.

Population

Personalities
 Roland Mesnier, former White House pastry chief

See also
 Communes of the Doubs department

References

External links
 Official website 

Communes of Doubs